Selenopyrylium is an aromatic heterocyclic compound consisting of a six-membered ring with five carbon atoms and a positively charged selenium atom.

Naming and numbering
Formerly it was named selenapyrylium. However, this is misleading as "selena" indicates that selenium substitutes for a carbon atom, but actually selenium is substituted for the oxygen atom in pyrylium. In the Hantzsch-Widman system of nomenclature, it is called seleninium. This is the name used by Chemical Abstracts. Replacement nomenclature would call this selenoniabenzene.

Numbering in selenopyrylium starts with 1 on the selenium atom and counts up to 6 on the carbon atoms. The positions adjacent to the chalcogen, numbered 2 and 6 can also be called α, the next two positions 3 and 5 can be termed "β" and the opposite carbon at position 4 can be called "γ".

Occurrence
Because selenopyrylium is a positively charged ion, it takes the solid form as a salt with non-nucleophillic anions such as perchlorate, tetrafluoroborate, fluorosulfate, and hexafluorophosphate.

Formation
Selenopyrylium and derivatives can be made from 1,5-diketones (such as glutaraldehyde) and hydrogen selenide, along with hydrogen chloride (HCl) as a catalyst using acetic acid as a solvent. A side product is 2,6-bis-(hydroseleno)selenacyclohexane.

When 5-chloro-2,4-pentadienenitrile derivatives react with sodium hydroselenide, or sodium selenite, and are then treated with perchloric acid, a 2-amino-selenopyrilium perchlorate salt results.

Properties
The positive charge is not confined to the selenium atom, but distributes on the ring in several resonance structures, so that the α and γ positions have some positive charge. A nucleophillic attack targets these carbon atoms.

Selenopyrylium has two prominent absorption bands in the ultraviolet spectrum, band I is at 3000 Å, and band II is at 2670 Å.  Band I, also known as 1Lb is from the 1B1←1A1 transition. The wavelength is longer and the band is much stronger than that of benzene. This is a bathochromic shift. The wavelength is longer than in thiopyrylium and pyrylium, but the intensity is weaker, due to selenium being less electronegative. Band II, also called 1La, is stronger and longer than that of benzene, thiopyrylium and pyrylium. Band II is polarized in the direction of Se-γ axis.

The nuclear magnetic resonance spectrum shows a 10.98 ppm shift for H2 and 6, 8.77 for H3 and H5 and 9.03 for H4 (BF4− salt dissolved in CD3CN). Compared to other pyryliums H2,6 is more than that of oxygen or sulfur, H3,5 is between  that of oxygen and sulfur, and H4 is very similar to thiopyrylium, but is slightly lower. NMR for 13C has the same trends as for the attached hydrogens.

Solvents include trifluoroacetic acid, methanol, dichloromethane, chloroform, and acetonitrile.

Derivatives
Many derivatives of selenopyrylium are known with side chains attached to carbons 2, 3, or 6. Examples include 4-(p-dimethylaminophenyl)selenopyridinium, 2,6-diphenylselenopyridinium, 4-methyl-2,6-diphenylselenopyrylium,  2,4,6-triphenylselenopyrylium, 2,6-diphenyl-4-(p-dimethylaminophenyl)selenopyrylium, and 2,6-di-tert-butylselenopyrylium.

Related
When the ring is fused with other aromatic rings, larger aromatic structures such as selenochromenylium, selenoflavylium, and selenoxanthylium result.

See also
 6-membered aromatic rings with one carbon replaced by another group: borabenzene, silabenzene, germabenzene, stannabenzene, pyridine, phosphorine, arsabenzene, stibabenzene, bismabenzene, pyrylium, thiopyrylium, selenopyrylium, telluropyrylium

References

Heterocyclic compounds with 1 ring
Organoselenium compounds
Aromatic compounds
Cations
Six-membered rings
Selenium(−II) compounds
Selenium heterocycles